The 2010 Rossendale Borough Council election took place on 6 May 2010 to elect members of Rossendale Borough Council in Lancashire, England. One third of the council was up for election and the Conservative Party stayed in overall control of the council.

After the election, the composition of the council was:
Conservative 20
Labour 12
Liberal Democrat 3
Community First Party 1

Background
Before the election the Conservatives ran the council with 21 seats compared to 11 for Labour, 3 for the Liberal Democrats and 1 for the Community First Party. 12 seats were being contested and the Conservatives were strongly favoured to remain in control of the council.

Candidates stood in the election from the Conservatives, Labour, Liberal Democrats, Community First, English Democrats, Greens and the National Front. Before the election the key wards in the election were expected to be Goodshaw and Stacksteads.

Election result
The results saw the Conservatives maintain a majority on the council with 20 seats despite suffering a net loss of 1 seat to Labour. Labour gained Stacksteads and Worsley from the Conservatives, but lost Irwell back to the Conservatives. Labour also came up only 19 votes short of gaining Healey and Whitworth from the Community First councillor Alan Neal. Overall turnout was high at 76.04% due to the election taking place at the same time as the 2010 general election.

Ward results

References

2010
2010 English local elections
May 2010 events in the United Kingdom
2010s in Lancashire